Kedma is a youth village in south-central Israel. Located in the southern Shephelah, it falls under the jurisdiction of Yoav Regional Council.

History
Kedma was founded as a kibbutz as part of the 11 points in the Negev campaign in 1946. It was founded on land traditionally belonging to the Palestinian village of Summil. After 1948, it also started to farm some of the land belonging to Bil'in.

Because of social and economic difficulties the kibbutz was abandoned at the end of the 1960s, and it became later on a youth village thanks to Reuben and Sara Mandell, who took in the youths of families who had been expelled by their parents for drug use or religious differences.  The group that founded the community planned originally to locate it near Netanya or the northwest shores of the Dead Sea, but after the latter was captured by the Jordanian army, they moved to the present-day location.

References

Youth villages in Israel
Populated places in Southern District (Israel)
1946 establishments in Mandatory Palestine
Populated places established in 1946